Sacred War may refer to:
 A series of wars carried out by members of the Amphictyonic League:
 First Sacred War (595–585 BC) 
 Second Sacred War (449–448 BC)
 Third Sacred War (356–346 BC)
 Fourth Sacred War (339–338 BC)
"The Sacred War",  Soviet song associated with the Second World War

See also
 Crusade (disambiguation)
 Holy War (disambiguation)
 Jihad (disambiguation)
 Religious conflict (disambiguation)
 War of Religion (disambiguation)